Ron Olsen is an American journalist based in Harford County, Maryland.

Early life
Olsen attended the University of Minnesota, Twin Cities and Bemidji State University, Bemidji, MN. He has studied vocal interpretation with Lilyan Wilder]  and Pat Fraley.

Awards and accomplishments
Olsen is the recipient of Emmy Awards for his coverage of the Malibu Fire in 1993, the Northridge earthquake in 1994, best newscast over 35 minutes in length (Prime News-KTLA-TV) in 2006 and a Peabody Award for KTLA-TV’s coverage of the Rodney King beating in 1991. In 2001, he was awarded first place for television hard news coverage from the Greater Los Angeles Press Club. Other honors include three "Golden Mike" awards from the Radio and Television News Association of Southern California, the 2001 award for spot news coverage from APTRA of California and Nevada, a Regional Edward R. Murrow Award for spot news coverage from the RTNDA in 1998 and two "Golden Quill" awards from the Pittsburgh Press Club.

Professional life
Olsen got his start in broadcasting at student-run WMMR Radio (now "Radio K") at the University of Minnesota. Before his career in television and radio news, he worked in TV production at KSTP, Minneapolis/St. Paul. He then moved into broadcast journalism at KELO-TV in Sioux Falls, South Dakota, WBNS-TV, Columbus, Ohio, KDKA-TV and radio in Pittsburgh, PA, WMAR-TV in Baltimore, MD, KABC-TV and the ABC Radio Networks in Los Angeles, KHJ-TV (now KCAL-TV), Los Angeles and KTLA-TV, Los Angeles. At KDKA-TV in Pittsburgh, Ron hosted the "Channel to Pittsburgh" talk show and the Group W public affairs show "Impact”. At KTLA-TV, he co-hosted the "Weekend Gallery" talk show.

Olsen joined the staff of KTLA-TV in Los Angeles in 1987.  While there, he worked as a reporter/anchor and as a talk show host. From May, 2002 to 2009, he worked with the staff at the Los Angeles Times, to adapt stories which appeared in the daily newspaper into pieces for television, which aired on KTLA-TV. Both the [Los Angeles Times] and KTLA-TV are owned by the Tribune Company, which acquired the newspaper for more than 8 billion dollars from the Times Mirror Company in 2000. The purchase gave Tribune a dual presence in New York, Chicago and Los Angeles, the three largest media markets in America, and it was said the company was eager to push for “synergy” between the print and broadcast properties.  owning both a TV station and a newspaper in New York, Chicago and Los Angeles. It was a solid plan that could have worked well had the future not arrived in the form of a brand new media choice: the Internet. The effect on the newspaper industry was staggering. Readership declined as consumers chose to find their news online rather than in the daily newspaper, and advertisers moved their money in the same direction.  Technology’s impact took its toll on Tribune Company. They filed for Chapter 11 bankruptcy in December 2008. In 2009, Olsen left Tribune and KTLA-TV, but he continued to write.  

Olsen is the author of more than one-thousand essays, most involving American politics and/or the media, which he has published on his blog,  He also writes poetry. His poems can be found on the websites motherbird.com and artvilla as well as on the London-based poetry journal Poetry Life and Times

He is a member of SAG/AFTRA, the Society of Professional Journalists and the Los Angeles Press Club and he served on the broadcast steering committee of AFTRA's Los Angeles Local prior to the SAG/AFTRA merger. He has also taken part in broadcast contract negotiations in Los Angeles and Baltimore.

In 2002, Ron Olsen joined other California television news professionals in demanding that more stringent rules govern the safety of news vans following an accident that critically injured reporter Adrienne Alpert. The demands were presented to Cal/OSHA, which eventually put the regulations in place.

O. J. Simpson
Ron Olsen was among the first journalists to arrive at the Bundy murder scene and was KTLA-TV’s principal field reporter for coverage of the O. J. Simpson criminal and civil trials, which continued for nearly three years. He followed Simpson in a news van during the famous "low-speed chase". and KTLA-TV’s coverage of the Simpson criminal trial was broadcast internationally.

During the course of the Simpson trials, Olsen appeared as a guest on "Reliable Sources" on CNN, "This Week With David Brinkley" on ABC and on WGN Radio, Chicago. His coverage of the criminal trial featured analysis from authors Dominick Dunne, Joseph Bosco and Lawrence Schiller.

Rodney King
He also covered the Los Angeles riots.  He was at LA police headquarters at Parker Center when the rioting started and later covered the federal trials of the four officers charged with beating Rodney King. The trial coverage was carried by the Tribune Company television stations.

Cross-platform journalism
Olsen took a desk at the Los Angeles Times in 2002, and spent more than six years fostering product-sharing between television, the newspaper and the Internet. In 2005, Olsen teamed up with Times columnist, Steve Lopez, to report on the execution of Stanley "Tookie" Williams at San Quentin State Prison. He maintains a website for journalists at http://workingreporter.com, and a blog at http://workingreporter.com/wordpress.  For several years his writing appeared regularly in the Valley News Group Newspapers in Los Angeles.

Ron Olsen has volunteered his time at several charities, including the Hugh O'Brian Youth Leadership Foundation and the World Children's Transplant Fund. He is a recipient of the "Celebration of Life" award from the World Children's Transplant Fund. Olsen is a member of Theta Tau Epsilon fraternity at Bemidji State University, Bemidji, MN. In 2004, he was named a "Distinguished Alumni" of the Paynesville Area Public Schools, in Paynesville, MN.  After spending more than 30 years in Southern California, Olsen now lives in Maryland, where he writes essays, poetry and is working on a book.

References

External links
 
 
 Ron Olsen's website mentioned in guide to best journalism websites 
 The Malibu Fire of 1993 
 Distinguished Alumni Award 
 Valley Newsgroup Newspapers 

People from Minneapolis
Living people
American reporters and correspondents
American television journalists
University of Minnesota alumni
Television anchors from Los Angeles
American male journalists
Year of birth missing (living people)